The Vijay Award for Favorite Director is given by STAR Vijay as part of its annual Vijay Awards ceremony for Tamil  (Kollywood) films.

Winners and nominations
2006 K. S. Ravikumar - Varalaru
2007 Prabhu Deva - Pokkiri
 Shankar - Sivaji
Visnhuvardhan - Billa
Radha Mohan - Mozhi
Ameer - Paruthiveeran
2008 Gautham Vasudev Menon - Vaaranam Aayiram
 Dharani - Kuruvi
 K. S. Ravikumar - Dasavathaaram
 M. Sasikumar - Subramaniapuram
 Venkat Prabhu - Saroja
2009 Samuthirakani - Naadodigal
 Bala - Naan Kadavul
 K. S. Ravikumar - Aadhavan
 K. V. Anand - Ayan
 Susi Ganesan - Kanthaswamy
2010 Shankar - Enthiran
Gautham Vasudev Menon - Vinnaithaandi Varuvaayaa
Hari - Singam
Mani Ratnam - Raavanan
N. Linguswamy - Paiyaa
2011 Venkat Prabhu - Mankatha
A. R. Murugadoss - 7aum Arivu
K. V. Anand - Ko
Selvaraghavan - Mayakkam Enna
Vetrimaaran - Aadukalam
2012 A. R. Murugadoss - Thuppakki
 N. Lingusamy - Vettai
 Rajesh - Oru Kal Oru Kannadi
 S. S. Rajamouli- Naan E
 Shankar - Nanban
2013 Kamal Haasan - Vishwaroopam
Bala - Paradesi
Hari - Singam II
Pandiraj - Kedi Billa Killadi Ranga
Visnhuvardhan - Arrambam
2014 A. R. Murugadoss - Kaththi
Hari - Poojai
K. S. Ravikumar - Lingaa
Siva - Veeram
Sundar C - Aranmanai
2017 Atlee - Mersal

See also
 Tamil cinema
 Cinema of India

References

Favorite Director